Valerie Jean Foushee (née Paige; born May 7, 1956) is an American politician serving as the U.S. representative for North Carolina's 4th congressional district since 2023. Elected to the North Carolina House of Representatives for the 50th district in 2012, she was appointed to represent the 23rd senatorial district in 2013.

State legislature
Elected to the House in 2012, Foushee was selected by local Democrats to fill a vacancy in the Senate caused by the resignation of Eleanor Kinnaird in 2013. During the legislative session beginning in 2015, Foushee was one of 12 African Americans serving in the North Carolina Senate.

Committees
During the 2021-22 session, Foushee served on the following Standing and Select Committees:
Appropriations on Education/Higher Education
Appropriations/Base Budget
Commerce and Insurance
Education/Higher Education
Finance
Select Committee on Nominations
State and Local Government

U.S. House of Representatives

Elections

2022 

On November 8, 2022, Foushee defeated Republican nominee Courtney Geels with 67% of the vote to her 33%.

Caucus memberships 

 Congressional Progressive Caucus
 New Democrat Coalition

Committee assignments 

 House Committee on Transportation and Infrastructure
 Subcommittee on Railroads, Pipelines, and Hazardous Materials

Electoral history

2022

2020

2018

2016

2014

2012

References

External links

 Congresswoman Valerie Foushee official U.S. House website
 Valerie Foushee for Congress campaign website

 

|-

|-

|-

1956 births
20th-century African-American people
20th-century African-American women
21st-century African-American politicians
21st-century African-American women
21st-century American politicians
21st-century American women politicians
African-American members of the United States House of Representatives
African-American state legislators in North Carolina
African-American women in politics
Democratic Party members of the United States House of Representatives from North Carolina
Democratic Party North Carolina state senators
Female members of the United States House of Representatives
Living people
Women state legislators in North Carolina